Guam
The following outline is provided as an overview of and topical guide to Guam:

Guam – organized, unincorporated territory of the United States of America that comprises the island of Guam in the western North Pacific Ocean.  It is one of five U.S. territories with an established civilian government.  The island's capital is Hagåtña (formerly Agana).  Guam is the largest and southernmost of the Mariana Islands. The Chamorros, Guam's indigenous inhabitants, first populated the island approximately 4,000 years ago. Discovered by the Spanish expedition of Ferdinand Magellan in 1521, the island has a long history of European colonialism beginning in the 16th century, and especially in 1668 with the arrival of Spanish settlers including Padre San Vitores, a Catholic missionary. Guam and the rest of the Mariana Islands were integrated in the Spanish East Indies since 1565. The island was a major stopover for Manila Galleons sailing from Acapulco, until 1815. Guam was taken over from Spain by the United States during the Spanish–American War in 1898. As the largest island in Micronesia and the only American-held island in the region before World War II, Guam was occupied by the Japanese between December 1941 and July 1944. Today, Guam's economy is mainly supported by tourism (primarily from Japan) and U.S. military bases.

General reference

 Pronunciation: 
 Common English country name: Guam
 Official English country name: The United States Territory of Guam
 Common endonym(s): List of countries and capitals in native languages
 Official endonym(s): List of official endonyms of present-day nations and states
 Adjectival(s): Guamanian
 Demonym(s):
 Etymology: Name of Guam
 ISO country codes: GU, GUM, 316
 ISO region codes: See ISO 3166-2:GU
 Internet country code top-level domain: .gu

Geography of Guam

Geography of Guam
 Guam is: a United States territory
 Location:
 Northern Hemisphere and Eastern Hemisphere
 Pacific Ocean
 North Pacific
 Oceania
 Micronesia
 Time zone: Chamorro Standard Time (UTC+10)
 Extreme points of Guam
 High: Mount Lamlam  – 11,377 meters above Challenger Deep
 Low: North Pacific Ocean 0 m
 Land boundaries: none
 Coastline: 
 Population of Guam: 173,000 – 179th most populous country

 Area of Guam: 
 Atlas of Guam

Environment of Guam

 Climate of Guam
 Renewable energy in Guam
 Geology of Guam
 Protected areas of Guam
 Biosphere reserves in Guam
 National parks of Guam
 Superfund sites in Guam
 Wildlife of Guam
 Fauna of Guam
 Birds of Guam
 Mammals of Guam

Natural geographic features of Guam
 Beaches in Guam
 Islands of Guam
 Lakes of Guam
 Mountains of Guam
 Volcanoes in Guam
 Rivers of Guam
 Waterfalls of Guam
 Valleys of Guam
 World Heritage Sites in Guam: None

Regions of Guam
 Regions of Guam

Ecoregions of Guam
 List of ecoregions in Guam

Administrative divisions of Guam
None

Municipalities of Guam
 Capital of Guam: Hagåtña
 Cities of Guam

Demography of Guam
 Demographics of Guam

Government and politics of Guam
Politics of Guam
 Form of government: presidential representative democracy
 Capital of Guam: Hagåtña
 Elections in Guam
 Political parties in Guam

Branches of the government of Guam

Government of Guam

Executive branch of the government of Guam
 Head of state: President of United States
 Head of government: Governor of Guam
 Cabinet of Guam

Legislative branch of the government of Guam
 Legislature of Guam (unicameral)

Judicial branch of the government of Guam

Court system of Guam
 Supreme Court of Guam

Foreign relations of Guam
 Diplomatic missions in Guam

International organization membership
The United States Territory of Guam is a member of:
 International Olympic Committee (IOC)
 Secretariat of the Pacific Community (SPC)
 Universal Postal Union (UPU)

Law and order in Guam
Law of Guam
 Cannabis in Guam
 Constitution of Guam
 Crime in Guam
 Human rights in Guam
 LGBT rights in Guam
 Freedom of religion in Guam
 Law enforcement in Guam

Local government in Guam

Local government in Guam

History of Guam

History of Guam
Timeline of the history of Guam
Current events of Guam

History of Guam, by period
Geology of Guam
Indigenous peoples
Chamorro people
First European contact, 1521–1668
On March 6, 1521, three Spanish ships under the command of Fernão de Magalhães (Ferdinand Magellan) land on the Island of Guam after a seemingly endless eleven week voyage across the Pacific Ocean. Magalhães names the archipelago Las Isles de las Velas Latinas (The Islands of the Latine Sails). When the Spaniards refuse to pay for supplies, natives take iron from the ships.  Magalhães renames the archipelago Las Islas de los Ladrones (The Islands of the Thieves).
Spanish East Indies, 1565–(1668–1898)–1899
Diego Luis de San Vitores leads the colonization of Guam, renaming the Chamorro archipelago Islas Marianas in honor of his patroness, Queen Mariana of Austria
The Spanish-Chamorro Wars (1670-1683 on Guam) pacifies CHamoru resistance and solidifies Spanish control
Guam becomes a major stopover for Spanish galleons en route to Manila, from Acapulco. A number of coastal forts are built to protect these ships, including Fort Soledad and Fort San Jose in Umatac.
Spanish–American War, April 23 – August 12, 1898
Spanish Empire declares war on the United States, April 23, 1898
United States capture of Guam, June 20–21, 1898
Treaty of Paris, December 10, 1898
United States Territory of Guam, since December 10, 1898
World War I, June 28, 1914 – November 11, 1918
United States enters Great War on April 6, 1917
World War II, September 1, 1939 – September 2, 1945
United States enters Second World War on December 8, 1941
Battle of Guam of 1941
Battle of Guam of 1944
Cold War, March 5, 1946 – December 25, 1991
Korean War, June 25, 1950 – July 27, 1953
Guam Organic Act, August 1, 1950

Culture of Guam
Culture of Guam
 Architecture of Guam
 Cuisine of Guam
 Festivals in Guam
 Languages of Guam
 Media in Guam
 National symbols of Guam
 Coat of arms of Guam
 Flag of Guam
 National anthem of Guam
 People of Guam
 Public holidays in Guam
 Records of Guam
 Religion in Guam
 Christianity in Guam
 Hinduism in Guam
 Islam in Guam
 Judaism in Guam
 Sikhism in Guam
 World Heritage Sites in Guam: None

Art in Guam
 Art in Guam
 Literature of Guam
 Music of Guam
 Television in Guam
 Theatre in Guam

Sports in Guam
Sports in Guam
 Football in Guam
 Guam at the Olympics

Economy and infrastructure of Guam
Economy of Guam
 Economic rank, by nominal GDP (2007): 150th (one hundred and fiftieth)
 Agriculture in Guam
 Banking in Guam
 National Bank of Guam
 Communications in Guam
 Internet in Guam
 Companies of Guam
Currency of Guam: Dollar
ISO 4217: USD
 Energy in Guam
 Energy policy of Guam
 Oil industry in Guam
 Mining in Guam
 Tourism in Guam
 Guam Stock Exchange

Infrastructure of Guam
 Health care in Guam
 Transportation in Guam
 Airports in Guam
 Rail transport in Guam
 Roads in Guam
 Highways in Guam

Education in Guam
 Education in Guam
 Schools in Guam
 Colleges and universities in Guam

See also

Topic overview:
Guam

Index of Guam-related articles

References

External links

 Government
 Official Portal for the Island of Guam
 Office of the Governor
 Congresswoman Madeleine Z. Bordallo, Delegate, U.S. Congress
 Guam Customs and Quarantine Agency
 Guam Election Commission
 Guam Code Annotated
 Guam Department of Revenue and Taxation
 Guam's Original Webpage

 Invasive species
 (Potentially) Invasive plant species on Guam (info from the Pacific Island Ecosystems at Risk project (PIER))
 Brown tree snake (Boiga irregularis) information from the Hawaiian Ecosystems at Risk project (HEAR)

 News
 Marianas Variety "Guam's only true independent news source"
 Pacific Daily News, A Gannett Newspaper
 KUAM, Guam's Primary News Channel
"Pacific News Center - News You Can Trust

 Overviews
 allthingsguam A Guam History resource—virtual textbook, virtual workbook and more
 Guampedia, Guam's Online Encyclopedia
 
 U.S. Library of Congress - Portals to the World: Guam
 The World Factbook on Guam
 Guam Connection – Guam directory and internet portal.

 Military
 Commander, Naval Forces Marianas (COMNAVMAR) Guam
 Andersen Air Force Base (AAFB) Guam
 War in the Pacific - Liberation of Guam
 Congressional Testimony - Guam War Claims

 Tourism
 Guam Visitors Bureau
 Guam Portal

 Others
 Guam Chamber of Commerce
 Maps - Perry–Castañeda Library Map Collection
 National Weather Service - Guam

Guam